Rhine Maiden (1912–1923) was an American thoroughbred racehorse.

Background
Rhine Maiden was sired by Prince of Wales Stakes winner, Watercress, out of the Golden Garter mare, Gold.  Watercress was also the sire of Preakness Stakes winner, Watervale.

Racing career
Rhine Maiden is best known as just the third filly to ever win the Preakness Stakes.  She did it in a time of 1:58 with Douglas Hoffman aboard by 1½ lengths over Half Rock and Runes. The filly appeared ideally suited by the muddy track and the front-running tactics employed by her jockey Hoffman. 1915 was the year that the filly Regret won the Kentucky Derby but did not challenge Rhine Maiden in the Preakness.  Not since 1915 has more than one of the Triple Crown races been won by a filly.

Racing at age four, Rhine Maiden won the Clarendon Handicap at New York's Jamaica Race Course.

As a five-year-old in 1917, Rhine Maiden recorded an upset victory in the Ladies Handicap at Belmont Park in June. In September of the same year she won the Regret Handicap at Aqueduct Race Track, beating Dorcas by three lengths.

Rhine Maiden died in 1923.

Pedigree

References

1912 racehorse births
1923 racehorse deaths
Racehorses bred in Kentucky
Racehorses trained in the United States
Preakness Stakes winners
Thoroughbred family 11